Fischer is a lunar impact crater that lies in the northeastern part of the interior floor of the huge walled plain Mendeleev. This feature is located on the far side of the Moon relative to the Earth, and can only be viewed from a spacecraft.

This crater has a slender, circular rim and an interior that has the same low albedo as the surrounding floor. There is a smaller impact crater within the interior, adjacent to the northwestern inner wall. The rim and the floor of Fischer are pitted by several tiny craterlets.

References

 
 
 
 
 
 
 
 
 
 
 
 

Impact craters on the Moon